Minho Campus Party (also known as MCP) was Portugal's first and largest recurring LAN party. It took place in the Minho Province region.

History
LAN parties originated in Northern Europe.

The event is considered a manifestation of the new opportunities for youth and youth culture in this millennium: All over the world, young people are coming together to create communities based on a mutual interest in computers and computing.

MCP 2005 Cancelled
Despite its increasing popularity over the previous 4 editions, the 2005 event (expected to be held between 27 and 31 July), was cancelled due to a lack of sponsors.

Professor Altamiro Machado

The idea of bringing an event of this type to Portugal, and specifically to the Minho area, came from Professor Altamiro Machado (one of the pioneers of computer science education in the 1970s), a professor and then director of the Department of Information Systems (DSI - Departamento de Sistemas e Informação) of the Minho University. He sought support and contacted the team of Charles Pinto, responsible for the Spanish event. It was thanks to his initiative that a group of about forty students of the DSI participated in the Campus Party  2000 in Valencia, with the objective of later helping the implementation of a similar event in Portugal.
Professor Machado died at the end of March 2001. During the 2001 event, a session was held paying homage to the professor.

Network
Cisco Systems supported the MCP since its first edition, and for the following four years, building the network infrastructure and supplying the necessary equipment (an investment of more than two million dollars). Before the role was taken over by ProCruve Networking by HP Portugal Telecom supports the connection.

MCP 2004
 3 (three) ATM, STM-1 (155 Mbit each), connected to the data centre of the Telepac (Portugal Telecom Group) on Porto.
 15,000 meters of optical-fiber
 30,000 of network cables

Areas
 Computer games
 Counter-Strike
 FIFA Soccer 2004
 Halo: Combat Evolved
 Medal of Honor: Allied Assault
 Need for Speed: Underground
 Quake III Arena
 Rise of Nations
 Unreal Tournament 2004
 Warcraft III: The Frozen Throne
 Age of Mythology
 Age of Empires II: The Conquerors
 Multimedia
 Linux and Security
 Mobility and Telecommunications

When official competitions didn't exist, participants frequently organized competitions between themselves, of which many became officially recognized by the organization.

See also

 Leeching (computing)
 LAN Party
 Minho University

References

External links
 Minho Campus Party, official page
 Minho Campus Party Forum
 #campusparty, channel in the IRC network, PTnet

Articles and news
 SIC Online, online videos (in Portuguese)
 Ciberia, photos
 Minho Campus Party, 2002 (format WMV) RTP2 - Magazine 2010
 NTV, 2002 (format WMV)
 RTP1 morning edition, 2002 (format WMV)
 RTP2 night edition, 2002 (format WMV)

Press releases
 Cisco Systems Portugal

LAN parties
Recurring events established in 2001
Annual events in Portugal
2001 establishments in Portugal
Summer events in Portugal